Taekwondo at the 2010 South American Games. Competitions were held over March 27–29.  All games were played at Coliseo de Combate.

Medal summary

Medal table

Men

Women

References

Taekwondo
South American Games
2010